Into Oblivion may refer to:

 "Into Oblivion (Reunion)", a song by Funeral for a Friend
 Into Oblivion (album), an album by  Rise and Fall
 Into Oblivion (video game), a 1986 computer game for the Amstrad CPC, Commodore 64 and ZX Spectrum